Montague Drake may refer to:

Montague Garrard Drake 1692–1728,  British politician
Montague Tyrwhitt Drake 1830 – 1908, English-born lawyer in Canada